Mills is the plural form of mill, but may also refer to:

As a name
Mills (surname), a common family name of English or Gaelic origin
Mills (given name)
Mills, a fictional British secret agent in a trilogy by writer Manning O'Brine

Places

United States
Mills, Kentucky, an unincorporated community
Mills, Nebraska, an unincorporated community
Mills, New Mexico, an unincorporated community
Mills, Utah, an unincorporated community
Trego (CDP), Wisconsin, an unincorporated census-designated place also known as Mills
Mills, Wyoming, a town
Mills County, Iowa
Mills County, Texas
Mills Township (disambiguation)
Mount Mills (California)
Mills Glacier, Rocky Mountain National Park, Colorado
Mills Lake, California
Lake Mills (Washington), a reservoir
Mills Reservation, New Jersey, a county park
Mills River (North Carolina)
Mills Creek (disambiguation), two American streams
Camp Mills, Long Island, New York, a military installation established in 1917, incorporated into Mitchel Field in 1938
Fort Mills, Corregidor, Philippines, a former US Army facility
Mills Valley (Juab County), a basin in Utah.

Antarctica
Mills Cliff, Ellsworth Land
Mount Mills (Antarctica), Ross Dependency
Mills Peak, Victoria Land
Mills Valley (Victoria Land, Antarctica)

Elsewhere
Mills Peak (South Georgia), South Georgia Island, south Atlantic Ocean
Mills (crater), a crater on the Moon

Buildings
Mills Building (disambiguation), various buildings
Mills House (disambiguation), various historical houses
Mills House No. 1, No. 2 and No. 3, three men's hotels in New York City, two of which remain
Mills Mill, Greenville, South Carolina, a textile mill converted into condominiums

Schools
Mills College, a women's college in Oakland, California
Mills University Studies High School, Little Rock, Arkansas
Mills High School, Millbrae, California

Titles
Viscount Mills and Baron Mills, titles in the Peerage of the United Kingdom
Mills baronets, three titles in the Baronetage of the United Kingdom, two extant

Other
Mills Corporation, a major developer of shopping malls in the United States
Mills Novelty Company, a defunct manufacturer of coin-operated machines in the United States
Mills Cross Telescope, a radio telescope in New South Wales, Australia
Mills Observatory, Dundee, Scotland, the only full-time public astronomical observatory in the UK
Mills Memorial Hospital, Terrace, British Columbia, Canada
USS Mills (DE-383), a US Navy destroyer escort which served in World War II
Mills, an Indonesian sports apparel company, supplier for the Indonesia national football team
Another name for the board game nine men's morris
The Mills (band), a Colombian rock band

See also
Mills & Boon, a British publisher of romance novels
Mills bomb, a popular name for a series of British hand grenades named after William Mills
Mills Brothers, an African-American jazz and pop vocal group
Mills Blue Rhythm Band, an American big band